Wu Yanan (born September 14, 1981 in Zhangjiakou, Hebei) is a female Chinese handball player who competed at the 2004 Summer Olympics. 

In 2004, she finished eighth with the Chinese team in the women's competition. She played all seven matches and scored 16 goals.

References

External links
 
 
 

1981 births
Living people
Chinese female handball players
Olympic handball players of China
Handball players at the 2004 Summer Olympics
Handball players at the 2008 Summer Olympics
Asian Games medalists in handball
Asian Games bronze medalists for China
Handball players at the 2002 Asian Games
Handball players at the 2006 Asian Games
Medalists at the 2002 Asian Games
People from Zhangjiakou
Sportspeople from Hebei
21st-century Chinese women